Scouting memorabilia collecting is the hobby and study of preserving and cataloging Boy Scouting and Girl Guiding items for their historic, aesthetic and monetary value. Since collecting depends on the interests of the individual collector, the depth and breadth of each collection varies. Some collectors choose to focus on a specific subtopic within their area of general interest, for example insignia issued prior to the 1970s Boy Scouts of America requirement that all insignia have either the fleur-de-lis or the acronym BSA; or only the highest ranks issued by each nation. Others prefer to keep a more general collection, accumulating any or all Scouting merchandise, or Scouting stamps from around the world.

Origins
The collecting of Scouting memorabilia likely began when Scouting was founded in Britain in 1907, though in those early years many did not think to save their items, and so much is lost to history. Early Scouters often sewed awards they had earned, as well as insignia they had traded with other Scouts, directly to woolen campfire blankets. Most of the original Scouting insignia of that period was wool itself and has not survived. Several beautiful examples of these early campfire blankets exist in the collection of the Koshare Indian Museum in La Junta, Colorado.

Purpose
The vast bulk of Scouting items exist, first and foremost, to recognize a Scout for his or her accomplishments in Scoutcraft, to engender feelings of kinship with other Scouts similarly outfitted, and to assist in the practice of his or her Scouting. The collection of Scouting memorabilia is one of the many ways Scouting can be enjoyed, studied, and passed down through one's family. Everything pertaining to Scouting can be collected. The concept of Scouting memorabilia is not limited to cloth and metal insignia, uniforms and awards, but extends to handbooks and advancement pamphlets, postage stamps, magazines, camping equipment issued by a national Scout organization, photographs, coffee mugs, and other items. Some of these areas may overlap with other spheres of collecting, when valued for a connection to a historical event; for instance if a president signs a document related to Scouting, the pen and the document itself may both be considered related to that president as well as to Scouting.

Living history
Another aspect of collecting is that of living history. There are several individuals and groups who collect period uniforms and equipment in order to re-enact Scouting of the past. Quite popular is the portrayal of Baden-Powell, authentically costumed, reading his last message to Scouts. Indeed, one of the Venturing (Boy Scouts of America) electives is Outdoor Living History.

Campfire blankets 

The camp blanket is a significant piece of memorabilia for many Scouts and Girl Guides around the world. Scouts and Guides sew badges onto the blanket to represent all their achievements and events competed in, and out, of Scouting. Camp blankets are often used to display and store badges "earned" in a younger section, e.g. a Guide will sew her Brownie badges onto her blanket or a Scout will sew his Cub badges.

The camp blanket is not limited to fabric badges or patches. The blanket can also include neckerchiefs, pin badges, sashes and other memorabilia. The size, shape and layout of badges on a camp blanket has no guidelines.  They can be randomly scattered, or organized in any way chosen by the owner.

Camp blankets can take various shapes but they are broadly found in three forms. 1) A standard blanked with fabric patches or badges sewn on but no change to the shape of the blanket. 2) A "poncho" style where a hole is cut in the center of the blanket, the blanket is then worn over the head. 3) The blanket has a slit cut from one edge to the center to allow the blanket to be worn over the shoulders, fastenings may be added.

Camp blankets tend to be worn at campfires and singalongs in the evening, where an extra layer is a welcome addition to normal clothing as the temperature drops. The blanket can also be used at night as an extra sleeping layer or pillow.

The first use of the camp blanket is unknown, but it can be traced back to Native Americans, who wore them as ponchos around their camp fires.

The blanket often represents experiences in the Guides or Scouts-camps attended, interest badges earned, and interests outside of Guiding and Scouting. Many Guides and Scouts take patches from their home area to large camps or international gatherings to swap with the people they meet, providing them with a memory of their experience at camp.

Evolution
All Scout organizations periodically change the design, name, and availability of their Scouting memorabilia, depending on factors such as changes in society (such as the shift from an agrarian society to an industrial society in 20th century America, or Macedonia's change in flag twice shortly after independence), availability of materials and manufacturing processes available, merging of local districts, councils and in some cases whole organizations, and frequently just artistic whim. The participant patch (usually embroidered or woven) for the first Japanese National Scout Rally was printed on paper, because of the financial situation of that time. Period pieces of Japanese Scouting memorabilia from the U.S. occupation period of Japan are rare, often fetching upward of U.S. $1,000.00.

Organizations and resources for collectors
Many organizations around the world are dedicated to accumulating and disseminating information on various Scouting memorabilia. The Scout collecting organizations Scouts on Stamps Society International (SOSSI), the International Badgers Club, the Scouting Memorabilia Club of Japan, the International Scouting Collectors Association, the Scout Memorabilia Collectors of Canada, and the  American Scouting Historical Society are a few of the resources available to collectors of Scouting memorabilia.

Many collectors guides and buyers' guides have been published since the first ASTA Blue Book in 1959, among the most well-known are the Arapaho series, which deal with locality-specific Boy Scouts of America insignia.

World Scout Collectors Meetings
The World Scout Collectors Meeting is an opportunity to view Scouting memorabilia and history, learn more about world Scouting and collecting, meet collectors from other countries, and acquire and trade Scouting items and other collectible objects. Regional and National collectors meeting also are organized.

Regional meetings

The First European Scouts Collectors Meeting (ESCM) was organized in Leuven, Belgium in 1992. Since then every year an ESCM is celebrated in Leuven (Except in 2002. The event was held in Ghent, Belgium.). In 2007 the name  changed to "European Scouts and Guides Collectors Meeting" (ESGCM).

As business
Only relatively recently has the concept of marketing such items for monetary gain come into play, though modern Scout councils have become rather market savvy and now often produce collectibles, items meant primarily and specifically for collectors, serving no other Scouting purpose. Some even later destroy remainders of such items to cause forced scarcity, artificial rarity which many see as depriving later or less-monied collectors of the possibility of filling a collection from their unit, regional division or area of interest. For merchants of Scout memorabilia, the Society of Scout Memorabilia Dealers serves as an umbrella organization.

See also

 Collecting
 History of merit badges (Boy Scouts of America)
 International Scouting Collectors Association
 Patch collecting
 Scout badge
 Scouting memorials
 Scouting museums
 Souvenir
 Boy Scouts of America Silver Dollar Centennial Commemorative Coin

References

External links
 
 International Scouting Collectors Association
 http://www.28thcambridgescouts.org.uk/cubs/campblanket.html
 http://www.santeeswapper.com/Campfire_blankets%20main%20page.htm

Scouting
Collecting